Byerley is a surname. Notable people with the surname include:

Julie Story Byerley, American physician
Thomas Byerley (disambiguation), multiple people
Stephen Byerley
Robert Byerley (1660–1714), English cavalry officer
Byerley Turk (c. 1684–1706), a famous English stallion